Kirkfield (Palestine) Aerodrome  is located  south of Kirkfield, Ontario, Canada.

References

Registered aerodromes in Ontario